The Sunflower League is a Kansas State High School Activities Association-sponsored league primarily based in northeastern Kansas.  Its members are currently 14 schools from Douglas, Johnson, and Leavenworth counties.

Members

References

High school sports conferences and leagues in the United States
High school sports in Kansas